Todd Susman (born January 17, 1947) is an American actor.

Early life
A native of St. Louis, Missouri, Susman graduated from Ladue Horton Watkins High School in 1965.

Career
Susman has appeared in over one hundred different television series and commercials and was also featured in the Broadway production of Hairspray, the 1970s films Star Spangled Girl (1971), The Loners (1972), Little Cigars (1973) and California Dreaming (1979). He later appeared in the major studio films Beverly Hills Cop II (1987), Coneheads (1993), The Juror (1996), and the remake of The Taking of Pelham 123 (2009). Susman was in the 2007 independent film, The Big Bad Swim, and the 2009 comedy, The Flying Scissors. He also voiced the lead character in the 2002 video game Soldier of Fortune II: Double Helix.

In addition, he appeared in the TV Movies Death Scream (1975), Portrait of an Escort (1980), Thornwell (1981), The Other Victim (1981), City Killer (1984), I Married a Centerfold (1984), The Guardian (1997), The Superagent (2009) and You Don't Know Jack (2010). He portrayed Sergeant Dobbs in the 1986 TV mini-series Fresno.

Susman's better known television roles include, between 1984 and 1989, as Officer Shifflett on 20 episodes of Newhart, and as the unseen P.A. system announcer on 46 episodes of the television series M*A*S*H (a task he shared with actor  Sal Viscuso, who provided the voice on 37 episodes), and one guest role in January 1974, as Private Danny Baker. Susman played Harold Bloom in 5 episodes of Orange is the New Black.<ref>{{cite web| url=http://www.broadwayworld.com/article/Todd-Susman-Jonathan-C-Kaplan-Lawrence-Craig-to-Star-in-WHEN-BLOOD-RAN-RED-at-KulturfestNYC-20150612| title='Orange Is The New Blacks Todd Susman to Star in 'When Blood Ran Red' at KulturfestNYC| date=2015-06-12| website=Boradway World}}</ref> He portrayed Ben Braxton in 6 episodes of Empty Nest, Victor Bevine in 4 episodes of St. Elsewhere, Glen in 4 episodes of Grace Under Fire, Bill in 4 episodes of Coach, and 4 different characters in 4 episodes of Barney Miller.

In 1976, he was a regular on the six-episode CBS adventure series Spencer's Pilots. He portrayed Ted Lapinsky in The Waltons (the episodes 'The Home Front' (1979) and  'The Unthinkable" (1980)) and appeared as detective Spade Marlow in the 1991 episode of The Golden Girls titled "The Case of the Libertine Belle". Before that, Susman submitted a pilot series for Grant Tinker for MTM Enterprises about an innocent young man arriving in New York City to start his career. Other television shows Susman has appeared on since 1971 include Love, American Style (3 episodes), Room 222 (3 episodes), Kojak, Eight Is Enough, The White Shadow, M*A*S*H (in addition to the 46 episodes in which he provided the voice of the announcer on the camp's P.A. system), The Waltons (3 episodes), Little House on the Prairie, Lou Grant, Remington Steele, Alice, Hill Street Blues, The Facts of Life, Cagney & Lacey, Night Court (3 episodes), Who's the Boss?, Punky Brewster (3 episodes), Webster (4 episodes), ALF, Highway to Heaven, Murder, She Wrote, The Golden Girls, Blossom (2 episodes), Married... with Children, The Commish, ER, Suddenly Susan, Law & Order, Law & Order: Special Victims Unit, and Bull.

In 2012, Susman appeared in the original cast of the off-Broadway Westside Theatre show, "Old Jews Telling Jokes", in which Jessica Shaw of Entertainment Weekly called his portrayal "the funniest moment...delivered with a Yiddish accent as thick as schmaltz". Jason Zinoman of The New York Times also complimented his performance, saying "the incongruity between content and form is perfectly tuned, and Mr. Susman benefits from resisting the urge to oversell the joke". David Finkle of TheaterMania.com also said Susman "often scores simply through his feigned stoicism".

In 2013, Susman, along with the Old Jews Telling Jokes cast and The Chew'' personality Carla Hall, appeared at Carnegie Deli to unveil the "OJTJ sandwich", named for the comedy group.

Personal life
In a 1971 news article, Susman mentioned he moved to Los Angeles because a friend told him he could make $500 a week as a writer. Unfortunately, the plan did not go well and he ended up making $60 a week as a writer for American International Pictures.

Susman has one child with his first wife Judy, who is a working actress. He married Bella Kordonov on November 6, 1982; they have three children.

Filmography

Film

Television

Videogames

References

External links
 

1947 births
Living people
American male television actors
American male voice actors
Ladue Horton Watkins High School alumni
Male actors from St. Louis
20th-century American male actors
21st-century American male actors
American male stage actors
American male film actors